Hamlet is a populated place in Batavia, a township of Clermont County, Ohio. Hamlet's elevation is 876 feet above sea level.

References

Unincorporated communities in Clermont County, Ohio